Leptospermum jingera, commonly known as the stringybark tea-tree, is a species of shrub that is endemic to Victoria, Australia. It has papery bark on the larger branches, smooth bark on the younger stems, narrow egg-shaped to elliptical leaves, white flowers and silky-hairy, hemispherical fruit.

Description

Taxonomy and naming
Leptospermum jingera was first formally described in 1996 by Andrew Lyne and Michael Crisp in the journal Australian Systematic Botany, based on plant material collected by Lyne from Brumby Point on the Nunniong Plateau in the Alpine National Park in 1994. The specific epithet (jingera) is an Aboriginal word meaning "remote and mountainous, bush-covered country", referring to the habitat of this species.

Distribution and habitat
Stringybark tea-tree grows in low woodland and shrubland and is only known from the type location and The Watchtower in the Snowy Range in Victoria.

Conservation status
This species is listed as "vulnerable" on the Victorian Government Department of Sustainability and Environment's Advisory List of Rare Or Threatened Plants In Victoria.

References

jingera
Myrtales of Australia
Flora of Victoria (Australia)
Plants described in 1996
Taxa named by Michael Crisp